Ahaura is a town in the West Coast region of New Zealand's South Island, sited where the Ahaura River flows into the Grey River. State Highway 7 and the Stillwater–Ngākawau railway line pass through the town.

European settlement of the area began with the establishment of a pastoral run near the junction of the Ahaura and Grey Rivers in 1858.

At one time the town supported six hotels, two butcheries, a bakery, a blacksmith's shop, and a printing office.

Demographics
The population of Ahaura was 96 in the 2018 census, unchanged from 2013. There were 57 males and 39 females. 96.9% of people identified as European/Pākehā and 3.1% as Māori. 12.5% were under 15 years old, 15.6% were 15–29, 46.9% were 30–64, and 25.0% were 65 or older.

The statistical area of Nelson Creek, which at 900 square kilometres is much larger than Ahaura, had a population of 669 at the 2018 New Zealand census, a decrease of 45 people (−6.3%) since the 2013 census, and a decrease of 48 people (−6.7%) since the 2006 census. There were 276 households. There were 381 males and 294 females, giving a sex ratio of 1.3 males per female. The median age was 45.2 years (compared with 37.4 years nationally), with 120 people (17.9%) aged under 15 years, 105 (15.7%) aged 15 to 29, 336 (50.2%) aged 30 to 64, and 111 (16.6%) aged 65 or older.

Ethnicities were 94.2% European/Pākehā, 10.8% Māori, 1.3% Pacific peoples, 0.9% Asian, and 2.2% other ethnicities (totals add to more than 100% since people could identify with multiple ethnicities).

The proportion of people born overseas was 8.5%, compared with 27.1% nationally.

Although some people objected to giving their religion, 57.4% had no religion, 33.6% were Christian, 0.4% were Hindu, 0.4% were Buddhist and 0.9% had other religions.

Of those at least 15 years old, 54 (9.8%) people had a bachelor or higher degree, and 162 (29.5%) people had no formal qualifications. The median income was $31,800, compared with $31,800 nationally. The employment status of those at least 15 was that 306 (55.7%) people were employed full-time, 75 (13.7%) were part-time, and 18 (3.3%) were unemployed.

Education
Awahono School – Grey Valley is a coeducational full primary (years 1–8) school with a roll of  students as of  The school was formed at the beginning of 2005 from the merger of Ahaura, Moonlight, Ngahere and Totara Flat schools.

Notes

External links
Web page about Ahaura

Grey District
Populated places in the West Coast, New Zealand